Dances with Wolves is an American epic Western war film directed by and starring Kevin Costner, who co-produced the film with Jim Wilson. The screenplay was written by Michael Blake as an adaptation of his 1988 novel of the same name. The film focuses on a former Union Army lieutenant (Costner), who travels to a military post on the American frontier, before meeting a group of Lakota Sioux, with whose culture he becomes fascinated. The film features Mary McDonnell, Graham Greene, and Rodney A. Grant in supporting roles.

The film received its world premiere at the Uptown Theater in Washington, D.C. on October 19, 1990. Orion Pictures gave the film a limited release on November 9, 1990 before a wide release on November 23, 1990. The film grossed over $424 million worldwide on an estimated $22 million budget, becoming the highest-grossing Western of all time. Review aggregator Rotten Tomatoes surveyed 66 reviews and judged 83% of them to be positive.

Dances with Wolves received awards and nominations in a variety of categories, with praise particularly going to Costner's direction, the lead and supporting acting performances, and the screenplay by Michael Blake as well as the film's cinematography, musical score, and editing. It was nominated for twelve awards at the 63rd Academy Awards, winning seven, including the Academy Award for Best Picture, Best Director, and Best Adapted Screenplay, in addition to a variety of technical awards. At the 48th Golden Globe Awards, Dances with Wolves received six nominations, winning three for Best Motion Picture – Drama, Best Director, and Best Screenplay.

The film garnered nine nominations for the 45th British Academy Film Awards, including Best Film; However, it did not win in any categories. It was also awarded by other organizations: Costner received a Silver Bear at the Berlin International Film Festival, while the film received the National Board of Review Award for Best Film, Best Theatrical Motion Picture from the Producers Guild of America, and Best Adapted Screenplay from the Writers Guild of America.

Accolades

Notes

References

External links
 

Lists of accolades by film